Mariamite Maronite Order (O.M.M.) is a Catholic religious order in the Maronite Church, an Eastern Catholic particular church in Lebanon belonging to the Catholic Church. OMM was established in 1695 in Qadisha Valley (Holy Valley) in North Lebanon, and since then it grew and expended to have different monasteries and centers in Lebanon, Egypt, Italy, Argentine, Uruguay, Australia, United Arab States and the USA (Ann Arbor, Michigan). Historically OMM had established monasteries also in Syria, Turkey, Sudan, Ghana, France ... but had to close these centers down for different reasons.
Currently there are about 100 religious in OMM, spread in its different monasteries and institutions (schools, university (NDU Lebanon https://www.ndu.edu.lb). Men interested in joining the OMM religious life are encouraged to contact Saint Serge & Bacchus monastery, Ashkoot, Kiserwan, Lebanon.

Maronite orders and societies